Jessica Edgar (born 15 March 2005) is a British racing driver set to compete in the 2023 F1 Academy season for Rodin Carlin.

Career

Karting
Edgar started her racing career in karting in 2010. In 2013, she moved up to the Cadet category. In 2017, she became champion of the Cumbria Kart Racing Club in Rowrah. In 2018, she won several kart races in the Mini X30 category. In 2019, she came second in this category in the Motorsport UK Kartmasters Grand Prix and fourth in the British Kart Championship. Also that year, Edgar took part in the FIA Motorsport Games in the Karting Slalom Cup. She missed the 2020 season due to the COVID-19 pandemic, but returned to karting in 2021 and finished thirteenth in the X30 Junior category of the British championship that year.

GB4 Championship
In 2022, Edgar made the switch to formula racing, where she competed for the team Fortec Motorsport in the new GB4 Championship. She achieved a podium finish at Oulton Park and managed to finish in the top 10 in most other races. With 269 points, she finished seventh in the final standings.

F1 Academy 
In 2023, Edgar switched to F1 Academy, a new class for women organized by Formula One, in which she will drive for Rodin Carlin.

Personal life
Edgar is the cousin of racing driver Jonny Edgar. They are part of the fourth generation of Edgars to practice motor racing. She lives in Ennerdale, Cumbria, and attended Keswick School.

Racing record

Career summary

References

External links

 

2005 births
Living people
English racing drivers
People from the Borough of Copeland
Carlin racing drivers
FIA Motorsport Games drivers
F1 Academy drivers
GB4 Championship drivers
Fortec Motorsport drivers